Zil-e-Huma or  Zill-e-Huma may also refer to:

 Zil-e-Huma, Pakistani singer
 Zil-e-Huma (Balochistan politician), Pakistani MNA from Balochistan
 Zill-e-Huma (Punjab politician) (born 1977), Pakistani MPA from the Punjab
 Zill-e-Huma (Khyber Pakhtunkhwa politician), Pakistani MNA from Khyber Pakhtunkhwa
 Zille Huma Usman, Pakistani politician and women activist